Thomas Henry Smith (22 November 1824 – 23 September 1907) of Auckland was an English-born New Zealand Native Land Court Judge and poet. He is best known for the Māori language translation of "God Defend New Zealand", one of the two national anthems of New Zealand, which he wrote at the request of Governor George Edward Grey.

Early life
Smith was born at Stroud, Gloucestershire, England. After his formal education he worked at a Land Surveying and Architecture office in Romford, Essex. In 1842, he went to New Zealand after being offered a cadetship by the New Zealand Company's surveying staff.

References

1824 births
1907 deaths
Māori Land Court judges
19th-century New Zealand poets
20th-century New Zealand poets